Saegertown is a borough in Crawford County, Pennsylvania. The population was 859 at the time of the 2020 census, down from 997 at the 2010 census. It was established in 1824.

History
"The settlement began at was is now known as Saegertown ca. 1795, when the brothers, Arthur and Patrick McGill, came to Woodcock Township. After Major Roger Alden built a sawmill in Saegertown, approximately 1800, the settlement was known for several years as Aldens Mill. In 1824, Daniel Saeger bought Alden's mill and adjacent lands and at the age of 44, he laid out the town under its present name. Saeger, a native of Pennsylvania of German descent, left Egypt, Pa. in 1823 to find a suitable place to settle. After he arrived in Saegertown, he attracted to the area a large number of German Yeomanry from Lehigh and other eastern Pa. counties. Being active in the community, Saeger was an early member of the Lutheran Church, the owner of a sawmill and general store, and a justice of the peace. He was a member of the Pa. State Legislature."

The Edward Saeger House was added to the National Register of Historic Places in 1980.

Geography
Saegertown is located north of the center of Crawford County at  (41.719482, -80.145660). It is bordered to the north, east, and south by Woodcock Township and to the west, across French Creek, by Hayfield Township.

U.S. routes 19 and 6 pass together through the center of town, leading northeast  to Cambridge Springs and south  to Meadville, the Crawford County seat. Pennsylvania Route 198 leads southeast  to Blooming Valley and west  to Exit 154 on Interstate 79.

Demographics

As of the census of 2000, there were 1,071 people, 361 households, and 251 families residing in the borough. The population density was 743.5 people per square mile (287.2/km²). There were 378 housing units at an average density of 262.4 per square mile (101.4/km²). The racial makeup of the borough was 95.05% White, 2.52% African American, 0.37% Native American, 0.19% Asian, 0.65% from other races, and 1.21% from two or more races. Hispanic or Latino of any race were 0.65% of the population.

There were 361 households, out of which 32.7% had children under the age of 18 living with them, 56.0% were married couples living together, 10.5% had a female householder with no husband present, and 30.2% were non-families. 25.5% of all households were made up of individuals, and 13.0% had someone living alone who was 65 years of age or older. The average household size was 2.45 and the average family size was 2.94.

In the borough the population was spread out, with 20.5% under the age of 18, 11.3% from 18 to 24, 33.3% from 25 to 44, 20.7% from 45 to 64, and 14.1% who were 65 years of age or older. The median age was 36 years. For every 100 females there were 122.7 males. For every 100 females age 18 and over, there were 125.1 males.

The median income for a household in the borough was $32,500, and the median income for a family was $39,688. Males had a median income of $28,281 versus $22,500 for females. The per capita income for the borough was $16,163. About 4.0% of families and 5.7% of the population were below the poverty line, including 6.4% of those under age 18 and none of those age 65 or over.

Notable people 

 Doug McKalip, chief agricultural negotiator
 Andrew Ryan McGill, 10th governor of Minnesota
 Sharon Stone, actress
 Melanie Tem, horror and fantasy author

References

External links
Borough of Saegertown official website

Populated places established in 1824
Boroughs in Crawford County, Pennsylvania
1824 establishments in Pennsylvania